Jonas Björkman and Nicklas Kulti won in the final 4–6, 6–4, 6–4 against Byron Black and Sandon Stolle.

Seeds

Draw

References
 1996 India Open Doubles Draw

1996 India Open
Maharashtra Open